The 2005-06 Philippine Basketball Association Fiesta Conference or known as the 2005-06 San Mig Coffee PBA Fiesta Conference for sponsorship reasons, is the first conference of the 2005-06 PBA season. It started on October 2, 2005 and ended on February 19, 2006.

The tournament has five rounds, the survivor playoff, the wildcard playoffs, quarterfinals, semi-finals and the Finals. All nine teams are included in the playoffs.

Tournament format
 Double round classifications.
 Survivor round
 Eighth and ninth seeds face off on a survivor playoff, with the eighth seed holding a twice-to-beat advantage.
 Wildcard playoffs
 Fifth seed and winner of the survivor playoff meet in a best-of-three wildcard playoffs.
 Sixth seed and seventh face off in a best-of-three wildcard playoff.
 Quarterfinals
 Fourth seed advance outright to the best-of-five quarterfinals, to meet winner of the fifth seed vs. eighth/ninth seed wildcard series (QF-A).
 Third seed advance outright to the best-of-five quarterfinals, to meet winner of the sixth seed vs. seventh seed (QF-B).
Semi-Finals
 Second seed advance outright to the best-of-seven semi-finals, to meet winner of the QF-B (SF-A).
 First seed advance outright to the best-of-seven semi-finals, to meet winner of the QF-A (SF-B).
 Finals
 Winners of SF-A and SF-B face off for the best-of-seven Finals for the 2005-06 Fiesta Conference Championship.
 Losers of SF-A and SF-B face off for a one-game playoff for the Third Place trophy.

List of imports

Classification round

Team standings

Fourth seed playoff

Second seed playoff

Bracket

Survivor playoffs

Wildcard phase

(5) Air21 vs. (8) San Miguel

(6) Alaska vs. (7) Sta. Lucia

Quarterfinals

(3) Red Bull vs. (6) Alaska

(4) Talk 'N Text vs. (5) Air21

Semifinals

(1) Purefoods vs. (5) Air21

Purefoods won the first two games, with Marquin Chandler scoring 46 points in Game 1, and 29 in Game 2 to put the Giants up, 2–0. In Game 3, Air21's Ren-Ren Ritualo scored 40 points to prevent a sweep at Antipolo. The Express had an awful shooting night on Game 4 to pave way for a 3– series lead for Purefooods.

In the closing minutes of Game 5, Air21 had a 17–9 run, but Purefoods had their run thanks to a rare four-point play from Kerby Raymundo. Ranidel de Ocampo split his free-throws to pad Air21's lead into three. With Air21 up by one, Raymundo rebounded the ball with 11 seconds remaining, but Roger Yap flubbed his pass and missed his lay-up against Shawn Daniels to give Air21 the victory. Purefoods erected a 20-point lead in Game 7, and Air21's run came up short as they entered the PBA Finals for the first time in four years.

(2) Barangay Ginebra vs. (3) Red Bull

After losing Game 1, James Penny converted clutch three-pointers to prevent a 0–2 hole for Red Bull. Clutch plays from former Ateneo teammates Enrico Villanueva and Larry Fonacier prevented a Ginebra run late in the fourth quarter in Games 3 to 4 that placed Red Bull in an imposing 3–1 series lead. With Penny resting on Game 6, Ginebra had a difficult win to close the series gap to one game; Ginebra's defensive stand forced a Game 7, which put them on the way of replicating the Ginebra team of 15 seasons earlier when they won the championship after trailing 3–1.

With a seesaw battle ongoing throughout the game, Ginebra import Chris Porter slam dunked to put Ginebra up, 75–73. Barako Celino Cruz converted a three-point shot to put Red Bull by a point, 76–75. Following a Ginebra turnover, Red Bull import James Penny converted his own 3-point jumper, to put Red Bull up for good, 79–75.

Third place playoff

Finals

Series scoring summary
The following scoring summary is written in a line score format, except that the quarter numbers are replaced by game numbers.

† denotes number of overtimes

Game One
Wednesday, February 8, at the Araneta Coliseum.

After conquering their respective semi-final rivals, the Giants and the Barako are both itching to win their first PBA titles in 4 years. Purefoods haven't won since the 2002 Governors' Cup, while Red Bull haven't won since the 2002 Commissioner's Cup.

The game was close throughout, with neither team pulling away. However, Red Bull ignited a run that would make them lead by 8 points at the third, but the Giants inched closer as they lessened the gap to a point. In the fourth quarter, Red Bull tried to pull away, but Purefoods fought back. In the dying seconds of regulation, with the score tied at 89-all, Purefoods import Marquin Chandler failed to convert an open jumper at the paint that could've won them the game.

In Overtime, Red Bull raced to an eight-point lead. In the final minute, Purefoods' Noy Castillo converted two three-pointers that cut the lead to two. But a crucial turnover down low cost Purefoods the game.

In the marquee matchup, former Ateneo Blue Eagle Enrico Villanueva, with 25 points, won the matchup against former Letranite Kerby Raymundo, who finished with 11 markers.

Game Two
With a masterful conquest of Purefoods at Game One, third seed Red Bull Barako aimed to have a commanding 2-0 lead at the best of seven series.

The Barakos opened the game with relative ease, with the Chunkee Giants within striking distance. Purefoods stayed close through the efforts of import Marquin Chandler. However, Red Bull's import James Penny appeared to have an answer on every shot made by Chandler. By the start of the fourth, Purefoods led by a point, 71-70, after Red Bull erased an 8-point deficit.

The fourth quarter began with Purefoods keeping close with Red Bull. However, Red Bull answered with a 12-0 run, capped off by a three-pointer by Larry Fonacier. Purefoods weren't able to erase the lead, leading to a 2-0 lead for Red Bull.

Chandler led all scorers with 32 points while Red Bull's former NU standout Lordy Tugade outscored all locals with 30 points.

Game Three
The last time Purefoods was down 0-2 at the Finals, they've rallied and won the next four games, clinching the 2002 Governors' Cup at the expense of the Alaska Aces.

Red Bull, on the other hand, is seeking for their third PBA championship, and the stopping of the four-conference championship streak of San Miguel Corporation teams (in which Purefoods is a subsidiary).

The first quarter saw easy baskets from Red Bull against a virtually nonexistent Purefoods defense. Purefoods, on the other hand, had to work for their every basket. Purefoods then had problems when their import, Marquin Chandler, got into foul trouble, forcing the Chunkee Giants to play All-Filipino for a great part of the first half. The quarter ended with the score tied, 26-all.

On the second quarter, Purefoods made key defensive adjustments that limited Red Bull's scoring opportunities. The Chunkee Giants also had big contributions from their bench, especially from Marc Pingris, who scattered 8 markers at the 2nd quarter. The Barakos still relied on the frontline of Villanueva and Tugade, with the former Ateneo standout scoring 15 points at the first half. Purefoods, however, seized the momentum and erected a ten-point lead by halftime, 54-44.

The two teams settled down at the third quarter. James Penny, the former Texas Christian and Oklahoma Storm player posted big plays, including a three-point play. Red Bull utilized the foul problems of Purefoods. Nevertheless, the Giants still led, 77-68.

In the payoff period, Red Bull inched closer on every possession. With Red Bull down by six, Chandler and Fonacier had a scuffle at the half court line. This led to a technical foul for Chandler. Red Bull nipped the lead to four. But when the Chunkee Giants raised the lead back to ten, Chandler fouled out at the 3:49 mark, which led to a 5-0 run by Red Bull. A Raymundo assist to Jondan Salvador raised the lead by seven at the 1:00 mark, and Purefoods never looked back as they clinched their first victory in the Fiesta Conference Finals.

Chunkee Giant Kerby Raymundo finished the game with 13 points, 11 rebounds and nine assists, a near triple-double. Villanueva led all locals with 25 points, while teammate Tugade had zero points in the second half to finish with 14 points. Penny won the battle of the imports, outscoring Chandler 31-26.

The halftime show featured the first part of the interview of ABC Sports' Richard del Rosario to Kris Aquino and Purefoods sophomore James Yap, who are engaged to each other.

Game Four

Before the game started, the league handed out its Best Player and Best Import of the Conference Award. The Best Player, restricted to Filipinos had a tighter race among Purefoods' Kerby Raymundo, Air21's Renren Ritualo, and Red Bull's Enrico Villanueva. The Best Import award, on the other hand, was contested between Purefoods' Marquin Chandler and Air21's Shawn Daniels.

Villanueva eventually won the Best Player award, when the PBA Press Corps voted him over Raymundo and Ritualo. The Best Import award, was in reality a no-contest since although Chandler and Daniels stayed with their clubs all-conference long, only Chandler was able to lead his team to the Finals.

On the game proper, just like in the previous three games, Red Bull got off to a good start when Chunkee Giant Jondan Salvador injured his knee. Penny and Villanueva combined for 25 points by halftime. However, Purefoods caught up with them at the third quarter, thanks to good shooting from Chandler and Noy Castillo.

On the fourth period, James Yap, who was celebrating his 24th birthday made clutch freethrows, much to the delight of fiancée Kris Aquino. Further freethrows from Raymundo, James and Roger (not related) Yap gave the advantage to Purefoods. A dribbling violation by Red Bull import James Penny sealed the win for Purefoods.

In the post-game interview, Raymundo said that for him, he should be the MVP, his coach Ryan Gregorio, agreed wholeheartedly, as Raymundo brought Villanueva to school in the dying minutes of the game, especially at the low post. Raymundo finished the game with 21 points and 9 rebounds, and was chosen as the player of the game. Villanueva led all scorers with 25 points, and 14 rebounds.

Game Five

Red Bull Barako seemed intent from the get-go to prevent a 3-2 Purefoods series lead, as they, like in previous games, surged ahead at the first half. Red Bull, through the effort of import James Penny and locals Lordy Tugade and Junthy Valenzuela each converted a trey, to give the Bulls their biggest lead 50-34.

Best Player of the Conference Enrico Villanueva, although he finished with nine points, his lowest yet in the series, he grabbed a team-high 11 rebounds. Penny and Rookie of the Year candidate Larry Fonacier carried the scoring load for the Bulls.

Best Import of the Conference Marquin Chandler had another day in the office with a series-high 43 points, but he did not receive support from the locals, especially when the Bulls won the battle of the bench, 40-13.

The Barako never looked back in the second half on their way for a 91-86 Game Five win. Tugade led all locals with 17 points, followed closely by Raymundo with 16.

Game Six

Red Bull put down the defensive clamps in the stretch and got several clutch plays from an array of heroes to finally send the Giants down to their knees and capture the PBA Fiesta Conference crown before a roaring crowd of 10,755.

James Penny was in the zone in the third quarter but solid contributions coming from Mick Pennisi, Cyrus Baguio, Topex Robinson and Finals' Most Valuable Player Lordy Tugade also help the Bulls clinch their third franchise title since joining the league in 2000.

Pennisi had big shots in the end, including two three-pointers and a long two, while Baguio, Celino Cruz and Junthy Valenzuela made great stops that rendered the Giants scoreless in the final one minute and 33 seconds.

Broadcasters
The Associated Broadcasting Company televised the games on Philippine TV.

The play-by-play commentators are Mico Halili and Ed Picson, while the color commentators are Norman Black and Quinito Henson. The courtside reporters are Richard del Rosario, Eric Reyes, Jason Webb and Patricia Bermudez-Hizon.

Trivia
 Talk N' Text failed to enter the semifinals of a PBA tournament for the first time since the 2003 Invitational tournament.
 Air21, technically made its second semifinals appearance in franchise history. Apparently, TV coverage mentioned Air21's appearance as its first-time ever. In 2003 they placed third in the invitational tournament.
 Purefoods made its first semifinals appearance since winning the 2002 Governors Cup.
 Barangay Ginebra played its first Game 7 since the 1991 First Conference title, when they were Ginebra San Miguel and defeated Shell for the championship.

References

External links
 Official PBA site

Fiesta Conference
PBA Fiesta Conference